Neva Augustina Edwards (born 1931) is an educator, lay preacher and former civil servant in Dominica. She served as Speaker of the House of Assembly of Dominica from 1993 to 1995.

At the Dominica Social Centre, she has served as manager of four NGO programs, including the Early Childhood Program. Edwards has also been a lay preacher in the Methodist Church.

She received the Meritorious Service Award in 1991. In 1999, she was nominated by the Dominica National Council of Women for the Caricom Award for Women in 1999. In 2011, she was inducted into a Hero's Park in the village of Marigot.

References 

1931 births
Living people
Speakers of the House of Assembly of Dominica
Dominica Methodists
Women civil servants